Wheeler Roger "Doc" Johnston (September 9, 1887 – February 17, 1961) was an American professional baseball first baseman. He played in Major League Baseball (MLB) from 1909 through 1922.

During eleven seasons in the major leagues, Johnston played for the Cincinnati Reds, Cleveland Indians, Pittsburgh Pirates, and Philadelphia Athletics. He batted .263 (992-for-3774) with 14 home runs, 478 runs and 381 RBIs, and was a member of the Indians team that won the 1920 World Series. His brother Jimmy Johnston was also a major league player.

Doc played against his brother Jimmy in the 1920 World Series, with Doc playing for Cleveland and Jimmy on the Brooklyn Robins. It marked the first World Series and first Big Four championship to feature two brothers on opposing teams.

References

External links
, or Retrosheet

1887 births
1961 deaths
Cleveland Indians players
Pittsburgh Pirates players
Philadelphia Athletics players
Major League Baseball infielders
Baseball players from Tennessee
Minor league baseball managers
Chattanooga Lookouts players
Buffalo Bisons (minor league) players
New Orleans Pelicans (baseball) players
Birmingham Barons players
Milwaukee Brewers (minor league) players
Seattle Indians players
Little Rock Travelers players
Atlanta Crackers players
Pensacola Pilots players
People from Cleveland, Tennessee